Andrew James Farrell (born 7 October 1965) is an English former professional association footballer who played as a midfielder in the Football League for Colchester United, Burnley, Wigan Athletic and Rochdale.

Career
Farrell's career began with hometown club Colchester United, making over 100 league appearances, before he moved on to play over 300 games for the Burnley, becoming the only player in the club's history to appear in two Wembley finals and wear numbers one to 11 during his time at Turf Moor. He went on to make appearances for Wigan Athletic, Rochdale, Morecambe and Leigh RMI before launching his coaching career. Farrell returned to Turf Moor to work in the club's community scheme and coach in the centre of excellence. He was then taken onto the full-time staff as assistant to youth coach Terry Pashley. As an 'A' licence qualified coach, Farrell is now a key part of the Clarets' youth set-up in helping nurture potential future professional players at Burnley.

Honours

Club
Burnley
 Football League Fourth Division Winner (1): 1991–92
 Football League Division Two Playoff Winner (1): 1993–94
 Football League Trophy Runner-up (1): 1987–88

References

1965 births
Living people
Sportspeople from Colchester
English footballers
Association football midfielders
Colchester United F.C. players
Burnley F.C. players
Wigan Athletic F.C. players
Rochdale A.F.C. players
Morecambe F.C. players
Leigh Genesis F.C. players
English Football League players
Burnley F.C. non-playing staff